Pukaar (also known as Pukaar - Call For The Hero) is an Indian television action-drama show, which premiered on 24 November 2014 and it aired on Life OK. The show is directed by Deven Bhojani and produced by Vipul Amrutlal Shah, starring Rannvijay Singh.

Cast
 Rannvijay Singh as Major Rajveer Shergill
 Raj Babbar as Amarjeet Shergill
 Prashant Narayanan as Dhanraj Rastogi
 Adah Sharma as Aarti
 Kiran Karmarkar as Advocate Ashok Pradhan
 Manish Nawani as Rahul Shergill
 Vipin Sharma as Bashir Khan
 Shubhangi Latkar as Jyoti Shergill
 Deepraj Rana as A.C.P Dilawar Rana
 Dishank Arora as Captain Yuvraj Shergill

References

External links
 

Life OK original programming
2014 Indian television series debuts
War television series
Indian Armed Forces in fiction
Indian action television series
Indian drama television series
2015 Indian television series endings